Mauricio Jubis (born 2 December 1945) is a Salvadoran athlete. He competed in the men's shot put and the men's discus throw at the 1968 Summer Olympics.

References

1945 births
Living people
Athletes (track and field) at the 1968 Summer Olympics
Salvadoran male shot putters
Salvadoran male discus throwers
Olympic athletes of El Salvador
Place of birth missing (living people)
Central American Games silver medalists for El Salvador
Central American Games medalists in athletics